Karolis Bauža (born 24 April 1987) is a Lithuanian judoka from the city of Jurbarkas.

Achievements

References

External links
 
 

1987 births
Living people
Lithuanian male judoka
Judoka at the 2012 Summer Olympics
Olympic judoka of Lithuania
People from Jurbarkas
Universiade medalists in judo
Universiade bronze medalists for Lithuania
European Games competitors for Lithuania
Judoka at the 2015 European Games
Judoka at the 2019 European Games
Medalists at the 2015 Summer Universiade